David Côté (February 10, 1915 – March 8, 1969) was a Canadian politician active in the provincial politics of Quebec.  Côté was the only member of the Fédération du Commonwealth Coopératif (the Quebec section of the Co-operative Commonwealth Federation) ever elected to the Legislative Assembly of Quebec.

Côté was a trade union organizer for the Congress of Industrial Organizations working amongst miners in Rouyn. He was elected to the legislative assembly as the CCF member for Rouyn-Noranda in the 1944 provincial election with 21% of the vote. He sat as an independent from July 22, 1945 until the end of his term and did not seek re-election in the 1948 election.

External links
 

1915 births
1969 deaths
Canadian socialists
Members of the National Assembly of Quebec
Congress of Industrial Organizations people
Trade unionists from Quebec